Bank of the Manhattan Company Building may refer to any of the following buildings in New York City:
 40 Wall Street, Manhattan
 Chase Manhattan Bank Building, 29-27 41st Avenue, Queens, also known as the Queens Clock Tower
 28 Liberty Street, Manhattan, formerly known as One Chase Manhattan Plaza